Kilglass Lough is a freshwater lake in the west of Ireland. It is located in north County Roscommon.

Geography
The lake is part of a system of lakes collectively known as the Strokestown Lakes.

Natural history
Fish species in Kilglass Lough include pike, bream, roach, tench and rudd.

See also
List of loughs in Ireland

References

Kilglass